Nahanni National Park Reserve in the Dehcho Region of the Northwest Territories, Canada, approximately  west of Yellowknife, protects a portion of the Mackenzie Mountains Natural Region. The centrepiece of the park is the South Nahanni River (Naha Dehé). Four noteworthy canyons reaching  in depth, called First, Second, Third and Fourth Canyon, line its whitewater river. The name Nahanni comes from the indigenous Dene language name for the area; Nahʔa Dehé, which means "river of the land of the Nahʔa people". The park was among the world's first four natural heritage locations to be inscribed as World Heritage Sites by UNESCO in 1978 because of its picturesque wild rivers, canyons, and waterfalls. The park is also said to be haunted or cursed, following the mysterious disappearances and deaths of several gold prospectors over the years.

Geography 

There are several different landforms in the park that have taken millions of years to form, and give it a diversity not seen in any other national park in Canada. Sediment left by an ancient inland sea 500-200 million years ago had since become pressed into layers of rock. As the continents shifted, the North American and Pacific Plates collided, the force of which pushed the layers of rock upwards. Ridges of rock bent and broke, leaving behind the ranges seen today. This same action also caused volcanic activity, sending molten lava into but not through the sedimentary rock. While there are no volcanoes in the park, towers of heated rock called igneous batholiths were sent upwards, pushing the sediment further up. The top layer of sedimentary rock was eventually worn away, resulting in granite towers that form the Ragged Range.

Over the last 2 million years, glaciers have covered most of North America, creating most of the land formations seen today. While previous ice ages affected the park area, the most recent, the Wisconsin Ice Age (85,000-10,000 years ago), touched only the most western and eastern parts of the park. This has left many geological features in the park much more time to develop than most of North America had.

The central feature of the park is the South Nahanni River which runs the length of the park, beginning near Moose Ponds and ending when it meets the Liard River near Nahanni Butte. The South Nahanni is a rare example of an antecedent river. The mountains rose slowly enough, and the river was powerful enough, that the river maintained its course over its history, meaning it has approximately the same path today as it did before the mountains rose. As the river was meandering, the canyons it carved while entrenching also meander. Most visitors only visit the portions from Virginia Falls (Nailicho) down.

There are four main canyons that line the South Nahanni River, named by prospectors, numbering them as they travelled up the river. The fourth canyon, also called Painted Canyon or Five Mile Canyon due to its length, begins with Virginia Falls, and was created as the falls eroded the limestone surrounding the river, working its way upstream. Because its walls are composed of strata of shale, sandstones and limestone, this canyon has long slopes instead of steep, flat walls like the lower canyons. Big Bend, a point where the river does a 45-degree turn, marks the end of Third and the beginning of Second Canyon. The final canyon is considered the most beautiful. Beginning after Deadmen Valley, First Canyon boasts the highest, most vertical walls, cutting through very resistant limestone. Following this, the river slows and braids into different channels, passing through the park boundary, and coming together again near the village of Nahanni Butte. Soon after the town, the South Nahanni River joins the Liard River.

Virginia Falls

At Virginia Falls or Nailicho in Dene, the river plunges  in a thunderous plume. Including the Sluice Box Rapids above the falls, it is more than twice the height of Niagara Falls. In the centre of the falls is a dramatic spire of resistant rock, called Mason's Rock after Bill Mason, the famous Canadian canoeist, author, and filmmaker. The falls were initially located downstream at the east end of Fourth Canyon, and over the centuries carved through the limestone rock that surrounds the river. This continuous erosion shifted the falls upstream and created the Fourth Canyon. Due to the mist, the immediate vicinity of the falls is home to several rare orchid species. Downstream from the falls, there are many notable rapids on the river including Figure Eight, George's Riffle, and Lafferty's Riffle.

Rabbitkettle Hotsprings 

The Rabbitkettle (Gahnîhthah) Hotsprings and tufa mounds are the largest of tufa mounds in Canada. The source of the springs comes from deep in the Earth's crust, near the base of the granite batholiths that form the Ragged Range. The volcanic activity that raised the mountains still heats the water deep below the surface of the Earth. The heated water percolates upwards, dissolving calcium carbonate from limestone deposits on its way by. When it reaches the surface springs, the water cools and the calcium carbonate particles are released. These microscopic particles settle to form porous calcite rims around the pools of water. These pools range in size from that of a bathtub to that of a fingernail. This process takes a great deal of time, and it is believed that the mounds themselves are around 10,000 years old, their creation beginning at the end of the last ice age.

These rare and fragile features are protected as a Zone 1, Special Preservation Area, and all visitors must be accompanied by Parks Canada staff in order to minimize impact and visitors to the North Mound are required to be barefoot.

Flora and fauna 
The park's sulphur hot springs, alpine tundra, mountain ranges, and forests of spruce and aspen are home to many species of birds, fish and mammals. The park lies within three of Canada's ecozones, the Taiga Cordillera in the west, the Taiga Plains in the east and a small southern portion in the Boreal Cordillera.

According to Parks Canada there are 42 mammal, 180 bird, 16 fish and a few amphibian species found in the park. In the State of the Park Report 2009 the NWT government showed ten species that the Committee on the Status of Endangered Wildlife in Canada (COSEWIC) had listed as special concern, threatened, or endangered that Nahanni National Park Reserve provides seasonal and year-round habitat for. These include common nighthawk, grizzly bear, olive-sided flycatcher, peregrine falcon, rusty blackbird, short-eared owl, wood bison, woodland caribou, wolverine and yellow rail. In addition the bull trout and the Nahanni aster are listed but without a status and the Canada warbler and western toad are listed as possibly existing in the park.

Mammal species found in the park include; black bear, timber wolf, moose, shrew, vole, Arctic ground squirrel, marmot, mink, beaver, pine marten, lynx, snowshoe hare, river otter, muskrat, and red fox.

Birds include the American kestrels, bald and golden eagles, loons, red-necked grebes, sharp-shinned hawks and trumpeter swans. It also includes the only known nesting site of the whooping crane.

Fish found in the park include, Arctic grayling, burbot, inconnu, lake trout, lake chub, lake whitefish, longnose dace, longnose sucker, mountain whitefish, northern pike, round whitefish, slimy sculpin, spoonhead sculpin, spottail shiner and trout-perch.

The diverse range of soils offers several specialized and uncommon habitats. More than 700 species of vascular plants and 300 species of both bryophytes and lichen can be found in the park, giving it a richer variety than any other area in the NWT. Nahanni aster is a very rare species of aster found only in the Park.

History 

The Dene, sometimes called Slavey, peoples have used the lands around Nahanni National Park Reserve for thousands of years. The first human occupation of the area is estimated to have occurred 9,000-10,000 years ago. Evidence of prehistoric human use has been found at Yohin Lake and a few other sites within the park. The local oral history contains many references to the Naha tribe, a mountain-dwelling people who used to raid settlements in the adjacent lowlands. These people are said to have rather quickly and mysteriously disappeared.

First contact with European fur traders expanding into the region occurred in the 18th century, and was increased with Alexander Mackenzie's exploration of the Mackenzie River (Deh Cho), and building of trading posts at Fort Simpson and Fort Liard. At both of these John McLeod, a Scottish explorer of the area, was to serve as manager. During the 19th century, most Dene families left their nomadic lifestyles and settled into more permanent communities, often close to the trading posts. Permanent settlements were established at locations such as Nahanni Butte, Fort Liard and Fort Simpson.

In the late 19th century, the Mountain Indians of the Nahanni region would travel down the Nahanni River each spring in mooseskin boats to trade the winter take of furs. Constructed from six to ten untanned moose hides sewn together and stretched over a spruce pole frame, these boats would transport entire families, their dogs and cargo of furs down the river during high water. Upon arrival the boat was dismantled and the hides traded along with the furs. Following a visit to the forts, these people would return to the high country with only what they could carry on their pack dogs.

The stories of the Naha, and dangerous landscape that they inhabited, grew in stature with the Klondike Gold Rush as some explorers attempted to use the Nahanni as a path to the famous gold fields of the Yukon, or to try and make their fortune on the Flat and South Nahanni Rivers. Although no significant gold was found, legends of haunted valleys and lost gold emerged after the headless corpses of Métis prospectors Willie and Frank McLeod were found around 1908. The Lost McLeod Mine, a legendary lost mine somewhere in the park, is supposed to have been where the two brothers found their gold. In the years that followed, mysterious deaths of other prospectors added to the legends. Alternative names given to the park, which include Deadmen Valley, Headless Creek, Headless Range and the Funeral Range, bear testimony to these stories and legends. In later years, Albert Faille was a prospector in the area and met writer Raymond M. Patterson. The latter's works brought minor fame to Faille.

In 1946 Calgary geologist and mining expert Frank M. W. Henderson returned from the valley reporting his partner Jack Patterson had disappeared. Henderson and Patterson had agreed to meet at a point near Virginia Falls. The first to arrive would leave a message on a large tree which both knew from previous trips. Henderson arrived first and left his message before traveling into the valley. He returned several weeks later only to find there was still no message left by Patterson. Henderson and his party camped there a few days, but one night were awoken by a group of First Nations people who warned of white figures moving along the valley.

In 1947 author Pierre Berton was sent by The Vancouver Sun to cover the north. He, along with pilot Russ Baker, flew up the Headless Valley. Writing on his journey for Macleans Berton remarked, "Frank Henderson himself, a man who perhaps has good reason not to want too many people rushing into the valley, was quoted as saying, on his return from the area last fall, 'There is absolutely no denying the sinister atmosphere of that whole valley. The weird, continual wailing of the wind is something I won’t, soon forget.'"

Jean Poirel imagined the idea of going down the river with inflatable dinghies. During the following four consecutive expeditions in the valley Jean Poirel discovered more than 250 caverns. The most important contained 116 Dall sheep’s skeletons (carbon-14 dated to 2500 years BC); Jean Poirel named it "Valerie Cavern" after his daughter. He took topographic notes and drew detailed maps, paving the way for the park's creation. During his last expedition in 1972, he escorted Pierre Trudeau, who came in person to evaluate this superb and fascinating region.

Park history 
The park was in "reserve" status pending settlement of outstanding Aboriginal land claims in the region. In August 2007, the federal government added an extra .

In a novel form of cooperation between federal government and native groups, the Naha Dehe Consensus Team was formed in June 2000 by Canada and the Dehcho First Nations. Their original main tasks included:
 prepare an Ecological Integrity Statement,
 complete a review of the Park Management Plan,
 prepare an Interim Park Management Arrangement, and
 prepare a Memorandum of Understanding Respecting Park Expansion.

In 2003, these were completed and the purpose of the team changed, now dealing with cooperative management issues, according to the Interim Park Management Arrangement, until the Dehcho Process is completed.

On 9 June 2009 the Government of Canada, with the Dehcho First Nations, announced legislation that will increase the area of Nahanni National Park to cover , including 91% of the Greater Nahanni ecosystem in the Dehcho Region and most of the South Nahanni River watershed.

The new park area is estimated to be the home of around 500 grizzly bears, two herds of woodland caribou, as well as species of alpine sheep and goats and other species. The new boundary will include the highest mountains and largest ice fields in the Northwest Territories. With the expansion of the park there have been several added designated landing sites. Because most access to the park is done by aircraft and air access is restricted in the park, there are set places aircraft can land. Before the expansion these were limited to Virginia Falls and Rabbitkettle Lake. Now there are five more: the Bunny Bar, Island Lake, Honeymoon Lake, Glacier Lake, and Seaplane Lake. However, only Virginia Falls and Glacier Lake are designated for day use visitation, meaning all other sites require visitors to stay overnight in the park.

A visitor centre in Fort Simpson features displays on the history, culture and geography of the area. The park was among the world's first four natural heritage locations to be inscribed as World Heritage Sites by UNESCO in 1978. The South Nahanni River achieved Canadian Heritage River status in 1987. Presently around 800–1000 people visit the park every year, most of which are overnight visitors who travel down the South Nahanni. The park is open year-round, but most visitors come in June, July, and August. Virginia Falls is the only area of the park where a reservation is required, which must be done months in advance to prevent overcrowding. For safety reasons, all visitors must register with park officials upon entering the park boundaries, and deregister within 24 hours of leaving. There is a park office in Nahanni Butte at the end of the river, where visitors can deregister. The only practical way to get to Nahanni National Park is by floatplane or by helicopter, usually from Fort Simpson but other communities and locations offering a gateway into the park include: Watson Lake, Muncho Lake, Fort Nelson and Inconnu Lodge. Some people do hike in from the Nahanni Range Road at Tungsten to the west of the park.

In 2007 the park was voted one of the Seven Wonders of Canada in a competition sponsored by CBC Television's The National and CBC Radio One's Sounds Like Canada. The park was the subject of a short film in 2011's National Parks Project, directed by Kevin McMahon and scored by Shad, Jace Lasek and Olga Goreas.

In fiction 
The area was featured in Sick Heart River, a fictional river in the Nahanni area, by John Buchan, 1st Baron Tweedsmuir who was the Governor General of Canada. Buchan had not visited the Nahanni but had travelled down the Mackenzie and wanted to visit the area. The River, a book by Cheryl Kaye Tardif, is based on stories and legends from the area.

The Nahanni River and its surroundings has also been featured in the French book La Vallée Sans Homme, written in 1973 by Roger Frison-Roche.

See also 

 Nááts'ihch'oh National Park Reserve
 List of National Parks of Canada
 List of protected areas of the Northwest Territories
 Nahanni Formation
 1985 Nahanni earthquakes

References

External links 

 Parks Canada
 South Nahanni River
 Canadian Parks and Wilderness Society - Nahanni campaign
 Northwest Territories Tourism- Nahanni National Park Reserve information

 
World Heritage Sites in Canada
Parks in the Northwest Territories
Canyons and gorges of Canada
Protected areas established in 1976
Dehcho Region